Efthymis Zisopoulos (born 5 February 2002) is a Greek professional footballer who plays as a winger for Super League 2 club Makedonikos.

References

2002 births
Living people
Greek footballers
Super League Greece 2 players
Trikala F.C. players
Makedonikos F.C. players
Association football wingers